The 2007–08 season was the 76th season of competitive football in Israel.

2007–08 Israeli Premier League

Israeli Premier League Transfers 2007–08
List of Israeli football transfers 2007–08

2007–08 Liga Leumit

2007–08 State Cup

2007–08 Israel State Cup Final:

Beitar Jerusalem wins the 2007–08 Israeli State Cup

2007–08 Toto Cup Al
Maccabi Haifa wins the 2007–08 Toto Cup Al.

European Competitions

2007–08 UEFA Champions League
Second Qualifying Round

|}

2007–08 UEFA Cup

First Qualifying Round

Second Qualifying Round

First Round

Group Stage

2007–08 UEFA Intertoto Cup
Second Round

|}

National team

Key
 H = Home match
 A = Away match
 F = Friendly
 ECQ = European Championship qualifier